Mohamed Al-Akbari (born 15 March 1996) is an Emirati football player who plays as a forward.

International career

International goals
Scores and results list United Arab Emirates' goal tally first.

References

Honours 
Al-Wahda
Runner-up
 UAE Pro-League: 2013–14

External links 
 

1996 births
Living people
Emirati footballers
Al Wahda FC players
Al-Nasr SC (Dubai) players
Al-Wasl F.C. players
UAE Pro League players
Association football forwards
United Arab Emirates international footballers